Guiba is a department or commune of Zoundwéogo Province in central Burkina Faso. It is located directly east of Nobere Department.

Towns and villages
The capital of Guiba Department is the town of Guiba.

References

Departments of Burkina Faso
Zoundwéogo Province